Nancy Navarro (born August 15, 1965) is a Venezuelan-American politician and the first Latina county council member in Montgomery County, Maryland. She served on the county council from 2009 to 2022, representing District 4, the largest and most diverse district in the county.

Navarro was appointed to the President’s Commission on Educational Excellence for Hispanics by President Barack Obama in 2011.

Navarro received international attention in March 2021 when two technicians were heard laughing at her accent during a virtual council meeting while she was speaking about inequitable distribution of the COVID-19 vaccination.

Early life and education 
Navarro was born in Caracas, Venezuela. She graduated from University of Missouri-Columbia with a Bachelor's of Science in Psychology.

Career 
Before running for public office, Navarro was an educator in the Montgomery County Public School System. She was elected to the Montgomery County Board of Education in 2004. She served five years on the Board of Education and held the offices of both President and Vice-President. During her time on the school board, Navarro co-founded Centro Familia, a nonprofit organization whose mission is to assist the economic and educational development of Latino and other immigrant communities.

Navarro was elected to Maryland's Montgomery County County council in a May 2009 special election. She is a self-proclaimed progressive Democrat who has championed legislation to increase racial equity, provide resources to Latinos striving for higher education and increase economic development.

In October 2011, President Barack Obama appointed Navarro as a member of the President’s Commission on Educational Excellence for Hispanics, where she served on the Early Childhood Education Committee.

In 2018, she was president of the Montgomery County Council. In 2020, she opposed ballot questions B and D.

In 2022, Rushern Baker chose Navarro as his running mate in the Democratic primary of the 2022 Maryland gubernatorial election.

Personal life 
Navarro resides in Silver Spring, Maryland with her husband, Reginald, and their two daughters, Anais and Isabel.

Awards and accolades 
In 2007, Navarro was awarded the Hispanic Hero Award by the U.S. Hispanic Youth Entrepreneur Education. She is also a 2009 recipient of the Heart of the Community Award from the Community Teachers Institute. Additionally, she has received the Maryland State Department of Education "Women Who Dare" Leadership Award, and the Hispanic Chamber of Commerce of Montgomery County Leadership Award. In 2020, she was inducted into the County Women's History Archives.

References

External links 
 The Politics Hour: March 12, 2021 | WAMU

Living people
1965 births
Hispanic and Latino American women in politics
Hispanic and Latino American city council members
Maryland Democrats
People from Colesville, Maryland
People from Silver Spring, Maryland
Politicians from Caracas
School board members in Maryland
University of Missouri alumni
Venezuelan emigrants to the United States
21st-century American women
County commissioners in Maryland